RCRG may refer to:

 Radioactive City RollerGirls, from Paducah, Kentucky
 Rainy City Roller Girls, from Manchester in England
 Rat City Rollergirls, from Seattle, Washington
 Royal City Roller Girls, from Guelph, Ontario
 Rubber City Rollergirls, from Akron, Ohio